This is a list of converts to Sikhism from Christianity.

References

 Christian
 Sikh
Sikhism from Christianity